"Rasa Sayang" (pronounced , literally "loving feeling") or "Rasa Sayange" is a folk song from Malay Archipelago, popular in Indonesia, Malaysia and Singapore. The basis of "Rasa Sayang" is similar to Dondang Sayang and other Malay folk songs, which take their form from the pantun, a traditional ethnic Malay poetic form.

Lyrics

Because this song is in pantun form, for each quatrain, there is no relevance of the first two lines to the message conveyed by the last two except to provide the rhyming scheme.
There are a number of versions of the lyrics of "Rasa Sayang", but it usually starts with this refrain:

Rasa sayang, hey!
Rasa sayang-sayang hey,
Lihat nona dari jauh,
Rasa sayang-sayang, hey

The refrain is then followed by a wide variety of popular Malay pantun

Malay version

Rasa sayang hey
Rasa sayang sayang hey
Hey lihat nona jauh,
Rasa sayang sayang

Kalau ada sumur di ladang
Boleh kita menumpang mandi
Kalau ada umur yang panjang
Boleh kita bertemu lagi

Controversy
Controversy over the song's provenance came to a head in 2007 when the Malaysian Tourism Board released the Rasa Sayang Commercial, an advertisement used as part of Malaysia's "Truly Asia" tourism campaign. Some Indonesians have accused Malaysia of heritage theft. Indonesians argued that it is a song of the Maluku Islands, and that it has appeared in early Indonesian films and recordings. Around a thousand Indonesians demonstrated outside the Malaysian embassy in Jakarta in November 2007 to protest the use of "Rasa Sayang" and other cultural items such as Reog Ponorogo in such adverts. In order to prevent what they considered cultural appropriation, the Indonesian government started making an inventory of such songs as cultural properties of the country.

Malaysia in turn argued that the song is widely sung through out the Malay archipelago, and that it belongs to people of archipelago, Malaysians and Indonesians alike. In cases where people have been migrating, trading and intermingling for centuries in a region, it may be difficult to make claim of cultural property. Malaysian Tourism Minister Adnan Mansor stated, "It is a folk song from the Nusantara (Malay archipelago) and we are part of the Nusantara.". The Malaysian Minister of Culture, Arts and Heritage, Rais Yatim, recognize that Rasa Sayange is a shared property, between Indonesia and Malaysia.

Early recordings and uses
Indonesian media reported on November 11, 2007 that an early recording of the song has been found. "Rasa Sayange" is known to have been recorded in 1962 by the Lokananta Solo record company. It was one of the Indonesian folk songs included in an LP distributed as souvenir to participants of the 4th Asian Games in 1962 held in Jakarta, along with other Indonesian ethnic songs such as Cheers for Joy, O Ina ni Keke, and Sengko Dainang.

The song was used in a number of films before 1962. In 1959, a comedy film in Malay language titled Rasa Sayang Eh was produced by Cathay Keris in Singapore. The song also appeared in the  1943 Japanese film Marai no Tora, which depicted the exploits of a Japanese secret agent Tani Yutaka in Malaya during the World War II.

In 1954 and 1950, "Rasa Sayange" was used in the soundtracks of Indonesian films Lewat Djam Malam and Darah dan Doa directed by Usmar Ismail. This song was also used earlier in a promotional film made about the Dutch East Indies now (Indonesia).  This film, titled Insulinde zooals het leeft en werkt ( Insulindia as It Lives and Works), used silent footage filmed in the Dutch East Indies in the 1920s by Willy Mullens but with sound added later, was released perhaps in 1941. The tune of "Rasa Sayang" can be heard in the film. The original footage of this film is stored in the Gedung Arsip Nasional, Jakarta and other museums. A further film also existed under the title Insulinde (1925) which was directed by Max Hauschild, but it is described as a silent film.

In 1970, the song recorded in Chinese but retains "Rasa Sayange" by Taiwanese singer Teresa Teng.

Trivia 
 The Rasa Sayange song is used as the opening title of a Cooking program with same title, Rasa Sayange which broadcast by MNCTV

See also

 Music of Indonesia
 Music of Malaysia
 Dondang Sayang
 Pantun

References

External links
 Malaysian Tourism advertisement with a modified version of Rasa Sayang in the background
 Rasa Sayange melody in a Dutch documentary
 Rasa Sayang Hey in the Japanese film Marai no Tora (1943)

Indonesian folk songs
Indonesian culture
Malay culture
Malaysian culture
Malaysian folk songs